Bryan Desmond Harrison CBE, FRS (born 16 June 1931) is a British virologist, and professor emeritus at the University of Dundee.

Works
Adrian J. Gibbs, Bryan D. Harrison, Plant virology: the principles, Wiley, 1976, 
Bryan D. Harrison, A. F. Murant (eds) Polyhedral virions and bipartite RNA genomes, Plenum Press, 1996, 
Michael W. Bevan, Bryan D. Harrison, C. J. Leaver (eds) The production and uses of genetically transformed plants, Chapman & Hall, 1994,

References

Living people
1931 births
British virologists
Commanders of the Order of the British Empire
Academics of the University of Dundee
Fellows of the Royal Society
Foreign associates of the National Academy of Sciences
People educated at Whitgift School